Kalininaul Until 1944 Yurt-Aukh (Until 1944) is a rural locality (a selo) in Kazbekovsky District of the Republic of Dagestan, Russia, located on the right bank of the Aktas River, at the confluence with the Sala-su River, opposite the selo of Leninaul,  south of Khasavyurt on the border with the Chechen Republic. Population:   predominantly Chechen.

History
The oldest village of Chechens in the Terco-Sulak Meternrech. It was previously known as Shircha-Evla, Yurt-Evla, and Yurt-Aukh.

Yurt-Aukh, as it was then called, was until 1944 a part of the Aukh District. In 1944, during the deportation of Chechens to Central Asia, the locals were deported and Avars from the neighboring selo of Almak settled in their place.

In 1956, the Chechens were allowed to return to the Caucasus, but the local authorities prohibited their return directly to their ancestral villages in former Aukh District. Only several years later the Chechens were able to start buying back their houses from the Avars.

On August 27, 2007, a clash between over one hundred Chechens and Avars took place in Kalininaul, resulting in eight people injured.

Infrastructure
An elementary and a secondary school operate in Kalininaul. There is also a House of Culture, a post office, a kindergarten, and four mosques (two Chechen and two Avar).

Teips
The village is inhabited by the following chechen teips (clans):
Akkoy
Pharchhoy
Bittroy
Chenti
Chontoy
Shinroy
Nokkhoy
Vyappy

References

Literature 
 

Rural localities in Kazbekovsky District